Saluc S.A. is a Belgian speciality manufacturing company. Founded in 1923, they are best known for their Aramith brand billiard balls. The company also manufactures other sorts of balls and bearings with high engineering tolerances for a wide variety of industrial and consumer-product applications, such as Logitech trackballs. Saluc also manufactures Aramith nine-pin bowling balls for the European market. 

On March 5, 2007, Armand Capital Group, parent company of Saluc, purchased the C. L. Bailey Co. of Marionville, Missouri. They also established new warehousing and office space for their precision ball division, entering the United States industrial ball industry.

External links
 Saluc homepage

Cue sports equipment manufacturers
Plastics companies of Belgium